A tribute act, tribute band, tribute group or tribute artist is a music group, singer, or musician who specifically plays the music of a well-known music act. Tribute acts include individual performers who mimic the songs and style of an artist, such as Elvis impersonators covering the works of Elvis Presley or groups like The Iron Maidens, an all-female band that pays tribute to Iron Maiden.

Many tribute bands, in addition to playing the music of an artist or group, also try to emulate the vocal styles and overall appearance of that group, to make as close an approximation as possible. Others introduce a twist on the original act; for example, Dread Zeppelin plays Led Zeppelin songs in a reggae style with a lead singer dressed up as Elvis Presley, while Gabba perform the songs of ABBA in the style of the Ramones.

Tribute bands usually name themselves based on the original band's name (sometimes with a pun), or on one of their songs or albums.

History
The first tribute acts to emerge may have been Beatles tribute bands, such as The Buggs, who attempted to look and sound like The Beatles while playing their songs. However, one might argue that Elvis impersonators qualify as well. Neil Innes's band "The Rutles", a humorous take on the Beatles, achieved tremendous success with a film, All You Need Is Cash, backed by George Harrison.

Although initially created to honor the original bands, many tribute bands have grown to have their own fan base. Only One Direction have performed to hundreds of thousands of fans, have completed four UK theatre tours, and debuted in their own show on London's West End in October 2015.

Those bands and artists that have inspired a cult following in their fans tend to have a significant tribute band presence as well, such as Little River Band, Lynyrd Skynyrd, Black Sabbath, Journey, Genesis, Led Zeppelin, Deep Purple, Styx, Pink Floyd, AC/DC, Iron Maiden, Kiss, Madonna, The Misfits, Queen, Alice in Chains, Grateful Dead, Van Halen, ABBA, The Rolling Stones, The Who, The Cars, R.E.M., Marilyn Manson, Rammstein, Neil Diamond, and Steely Dan.

More recently, tribute acts have looked to capitalize on the success of the pop genre, with a heavy focus on newer acts such as One Direction, Adele, Take That, The Wanted, Taylor Swift, Britney Spears and Beyoncé.
 
In 1997, the British journalist Tony Barrell wrote a feature for The Sunday Times about the UK tribute-band scene, which mentioned bands including Pink Fraud, the Pretend Pretenders and Clouded House. In the piece, Barrell asserted that "the main cradle of the tribute band...is Australia. Starved of big names, owing to their reluctance to put Oz on their tour itineraries, Australians were quite unembarrassed about creating home-grown versions. Then, like an airborne seed, one of these bands just happened to drift to Britain." The band in question was the ABBA tribute Björn Again, who staged a successful publicity stunt in the early 1990s, arriving at Heathrow Airport in white one-piece outfits similar to the ones worn by ABBA on the cover of their 1976 album, Arrival. Other tribute acts such as The Beatnix (Beatles), Zeppelin Live, and The Australian Pink Floyd Show have experienced continued popularity for over a decade.

In 1998, two men who were in a Blues Brothers tribute band changed their names officially by deed poll to Joliet Jake Blues and Elwood Jake Blues. They also are the only men in the UK to have their sunglasses on in their passport and driving licence photos.

In 2000, filmmakers Jeff Economy and Darren Hacker produced the documentary film ...An Incredible Simulation, which examined the tribute band phenomenon.  The title was taken from the promotion of Beatlemania advertised as "Not the Beatles, but an incredible simulation."  Produced separately and independently in 2001 was the documentary Tribute by directors Kris Curry and Rich Fox, which also covered the movement. In 2007, producers Allison Grace and Michelle Metivier produced a four-part documentary series called "Tribute Bands" for Global TV which features tributes to The Police, Queen, Rush and The Tragically Hip.

In 2002, the first biography of a tribute band was published by SAF in London. Titled Being John Lennon, the book is a humorous account of life on the road in The Beatles' tribute "Sgt. Pepper's Only Dart Board Band", written by the group's founder, Martin Dimery.

In 2003, Mandonna, an all-male tribute to Madonna, was formed in response to the rise of all-female tribute acts such as The Iron Maidens, Lez Zeppelin and AC/DShe.

In 2005, original Lynyrd Skynyrd members Ed King (co-author of "Sweet Home Alabama"), drummers Artimus Pyle and Bob Burns, and "Honkettes" Leslie Hawkins and JoJo Billingsley all played with The Saturday Night Special Band, a Lynyrd Skynyrd tribute from New York. This was the first tribute band to be composed of more original members than the current touring lineup of Lynyrd Skynyrd.

In 2005, tribute band Beatallica received attention when they were threatened with a lawsuit by Sony Music Entertainment over their unique interpretation of Beatles songs done in a Metallica style. With the help of Metallica drummer/co-founder Lars Ulrich, Beatallica won their legal battle, and still record and tour today.

On February 9, 2007, The Fab Faux appeared on the Late Show with David Letterman. The group was founded by Will Lee, bassist for Late Show with David Letterman and band member Jimmy Vivino was a featured player in the Max Weinberg 7, the house band for Late Night with Conan O'Brien. It was the first time a tribute band performed on Late Show with David Letterman.

In November 2008, for one week Late Show with David Letterman featured tribute bands each night: Purple Reign (Prince), The Cold Hard Cash (Johnny Cash), Mr. Brownstone (Guns N’ Roses), Super Diamond (Neil Diamond) and The Allstarz (James Brown)

Original Deep Purple drummer Ian Paice has played with members of the Deep Purple tribute band Purpendicular in 2002, 2004 and 2007, and the whole band on European tours in December 2008, March 2012 (which included a surprise appearance of original Deep Purple bassist Roger Glover in Switzerland), October 2014, March 2015, March 2016, December 2018 and August 2019.

David Brighton, (whose act "Space Oddity – David Brighton's Tribute to David Bowie" tours each year) featured in a short 2004 promo film with Bowie himself, together promoting the new Bowie album "Reality".

The late soul singer Charles Bradley had considerable success in his own right after starting his career as a James Brown tribute act.

Not all tribute acts use the impersonation style. An example is The Muffin Men, who play the music of Frank Zappa in their own style, do not look like, or attempt to look like original members, and often tour with former band members. Jimmy Carl Black was a regular in the band, and they have in the past played, recorded, and toured with Ike Willis and Don Preston.

"From the Jam" regularly play compositions by Paul Weller and the Jam featuring bassist Bruce Foxton and previously Rick Buckler. Despite being seen as a tribute act even with an original member, they have recorded original material at Weller's studios.

Tribute acts are not always welcomed by the original acts they are patterned after. In April 2009, Bon Jovi sued the Los Angeles-based all-female tribute Blonde Jovi for copyright infringement. After temporarily using the name Blonde Jersey, the band reverted to Blonde Jovi before disbanding in February 2010.

In 2012 the first ever television show dedicated to tribute bands called The Tribute Show made its debut on Australian cable channel Aurora Community Channel (channel 183) on Foxtel in Australia. The show is still currently on air.

In 2013 through 2017, a television series titled The World's Greatest Tribute Bands appeared on American cable television network AXS TV.

In 2017 BBC Music released three short films for BBC iPlayer in the run up to Glastonbury Festival, each one featuring tribute acts to the three Glastonbury headliners that year: Foo Fighters, Radiohead and Ed Sheeran. The first was entitled ‘My Hero: UK Foo Fighters’ featuring UK Foo Fighters tribute band.

In April of 2020 Post Malone, drummer Travis Barker of Blink 182, bassist Brian Lee and guitarist Nick Mack performed a Nirvana Tribute Concert to raise funds for The United Nations Foundation’s COVID-19 Solidarity Response Fund for The World Health Organization (WHO) in support of COVID-19 relief efforts.

From tribute to the genuine article

There have been several instances where members of a tribute band have been called up to join the actual band they were paying tribute to, or a related band that features members of that band, after a current member dies or leaves the group. This is often seen as a great way for bands to carry on since tribute band members have usually studied their part and can closely replicate the musical parts of the original artists. Some examples include:

Lead singer Rob Halford left Judas Priest in 1992 and was replaced by Tim "Ripper" Owens from the tribute band British Steel in 1996. This was the first publicised example of a tribute performer joining the band they were paying tribute to and was the inspiration for the 2001 film Rock Star. Owens eventually left Judas Priest in 2003 when Halford rejoined the band.
Tommy Thayer, who once played with the Kiss cover band Cold Gin as Ace Frehley, became Frehley's replacement in Kiss in 2002. Prior to these events, Thayer had worked with Kiss as a songwriter on their 1989 album Hot in the Shade and a session guitarist on the 1998 album Psycho Circus, and had assisted Frehley in re-learning his guitar parts to old Kiss songs for a reunion tour after the latter's long hiatus from the band.
When original drummer for The Jam Rick Buckler formed the band The Gift in 2006, which performed Jam material, guitarist Russell Hastings joined on guitar. Hastings had been a member of a Jam tribute band. Later that year original Jam bassist Bruce Foxton joined the band as well and they changed their name to From The Jam. Even though Buckler has left, Hastings still performs in the band with Foxton.
In 2007 Journey's then lead singer Jeff Scott Soto was fired. They approached Jeremey Hunsicker of the Journey tribute band Frontiers and had him audition for the group. While he did not ultimately end up performing or formally recording with the band, he did rehearse with them and got a songwriting credit on their album Revelation.
When singer Jon Anderson was unable to rejoin progressive rock band Yes in 2008 due to health problems, Benoît David replaced him after bassist Chris Squire discovered a video of him performing with a Yes tribute band called Close to the Edge. David left the band in 2012 and was replaced by Jon Davison, who was with the Yes tribute band Roundabout.
In 2009, original Grateful Dead members Bob Weir and Phil Lesh formed the band Furthur, whose repertoire consists primarily of Grateful Dead songs. They selected guitarist John Kadlecik from the Dead tribute band Dark Star Orchestra to play the parts of the late Jerry Garcia. Since Furthur's breakup in 2014 Kadlecik has occasionally performed with Phil Lesh & Friends.
In 2010 singer Dave Brock joined Ray Manzarek and Robby Krieger of The Doors in their reformation project Manzarek-Krieger. Brock had performed in The Doors cover band Wild Child for over 20 years. Manzarek-Krieger ceased to exist in 2013 following the death of Ray Manzarek.

List of notable tribute acts

Some notable tribute acts include (alphabetically by covered act, and alphabetically for each):

Playing music by ABBA:
 A*Teens
 Björn Again (Australia-based tribute)
 Gabba (songs of ABBA in the style of The Ramones)

Playing music by AC/DC:

 AC/DShe (San Francisco-based all-female band; covering only the Bon Scott era)
 Don Coleman
 Hayseed Dixie (began as an AC/DC tribute band before expanding to other rock covers, all in a bluegrass style)
 Hell's Belles (Seattle-based all-female band)

Playing music by Animetal:
 Animetal USA (featuring Mike Vescera, Chris Impellitteri, Rudy Sarzo, and Jon Dette)

Playing music by The Beatles:

 1964 the Tribute
 Beatlejuice (founded by former Boston frontman Brad Delp)
 Beatlemania (Broadway musical revue focused on the Beatles music)
 The Beatnix
 The Bootleg Beatles
 The Buggs (one of the earliest tribute bands)
 The Cast of Beatlemania (former members of the Beatlemania musical)
 The Fab Faux
 The Fab Four
 RAIN – A Tribute to The Beatles
 Rubber Souldiers
 Ultimate Beatles
 Yellow Matter Custard (featuring Paul Gilbert and Mike Portnoy)

Playing music by Björk:
 Travis Sullivan's Bjorkestra

Playing music by Black Sabbath:
 Sapattivuosi (Finnish tribute featuring Marko Hietala of Nightwish)
 Bat Sabbath (Canadian Tribute band, formed by members of Cancer Bats)
Playing music by The Cure:
 The Cureheads

Playing music by Chicago:
Leonid and Friends

Playing music by Depeche Mode
 Strangelove

Playing music by Neil Diamond
 Super Diamond

Playing music by Duran Duran:
 Joanne Joanne (all-female)

Playing music by Foo Fighters:
 UK Foo Fighters (UK based, established 2007)

Playing music by Genesis:
 The Musical Box
 ReGenesis

Playing music by The Grateful Dead:
 Dark Star Orchestra
 Jazz Is Dead
 Joe Russo's Almost Dead

Playing music by Iron Maiden:
 The Iron Maidens (Los Angeles-based all-female band, featuring Linda McDonald of Phantom Blue)
 Maiden uniteD

Playing music by KISS:
 Mini Kiss (a little person band)

Playing music by Led Zeppelin:
 Jason Bonham's Led Zeppelin Evening (John Bonham's son tribute to Led Zeppelin) 
 Dread Zeppelin (in a reggae style with an Elvis impersonator on  vocals)
 Led Zepagain
 Lez Zeppelin (all-female band)
 Michael White & The White
 Zepparella (all-female band)

Playing music by Bob Marley:
 Katchafire (started as a tribute band before moving on to playing original music)

Playing music by Metallica:
 Apocalyptica (initially only played Metallica songs on cello)

Playing music by Oasis:
 No Way Sis

Playing music by the Pet Shop Boys:
 West End Girls

Playing music by Pink Floyd:
 Australian Pink Floyd Show
 Brit Floyd
 Kings Of Floyd
 The Machine

Playing music by Pink Lady:
 Pink Babies

Playing music by Prince

 Purple Reign

Playing music by Queen:
 God Save the Queen (Argentina-based tribute)
 One Night of Queen
 Queen Extravaganza Tour (developed by Queen drummer Roger Taylor)
 Break Free - Queen Tribute Show (European tribute band)

Playing music by The Ramones
 The Osaka Ramones (Japanese band Shonen Knife performing as a Ramones tribute band)
 The Ramainz (formerly The Ramains, featured two Ramones members)

Playing music by The Rolling Stones:
Sticky Fingers (featuring Glen Carroll and musicians who have performed with the Rolling Stones)

Playing music by The Smiths:
 Smithdom – The Smiths Tribute Band
 The Smiths Indeed

Playing music by George Strait
 Ty Taylor

Playing music by Sublime:
 Badfish

Playing music by The Tremeloes
 The Trems (featuring former members of The Tremeloes)

Playing music by The Who:
 The Whodlums

Playing music by Frank Zappa:
 Muffin Men
 Zappa Plays Zappa (led by Zappa's son Dweezil Zappa)

Parody acts
Some groups have played and recorded music that parodies a specific artist or band, either by performing the original songs with modified lyrics or doing more general stylistic parodies. Examples include The Rutles and Zombeatles (for The Beatles), Beatallica (for The Beatles and Metallica), Take Fat (for Take That), 2 Live Jews (for 2 Live Crew) and The Pizza Underground (for The Velvet Underground).

They Might Be Giants has occasionally played their own tribute band, opening for themselves as Sapphire Bullets and performing the album Flood from start to finish.

See also
 Cover version
 Cover band
 Elvis impersonator
 Tom Jones impersonator
 Tribute album

References

External links

 CBS SUNDAY MORNING September 9th 2007
 USA TODAY August 12th 2012

 
Types of musical groups
Acts